Yanko Ivanov Bratanov (born 10 June 1952) is a Bulgarian former track and field athlete. He won gold in the 400 metres at the 1976 European Indoor Championships and was an Olympic finalist in the 400 m hurdles in 1976 and 1980. After his athletic career he has worked as a coach in Qatar and Bahrain.

Biography

Athletic career
Bratanov was born in Sliven on 10 June 1952. He took up athletics early, initially competing in the 110 m hurdles but switching to the 400 m hurdles as a youth. In 1970 he represented Bulgaria at the European Junior Championships in Colombes, but was eliminated in the first round.

Bratanov equalled the Bulgarian record in the 400 m hurdles (51.8) in 1971; in 1972, he won the Bulgarian championship for the first time and improved the national record to 51.24. He repeated as national champion in 1973 and 1974; at the 1974 European Championships in Rome he was eliminated in the semi-finals, but set a new Bulgarian record of 50.66. In 1975 Bratanov won bronze at the European Indoor Championships in Katowice as the Bulgarian team's anchor in the 4 × 2 laps relay.

At the 1976 European Indoor Championships in Munich Bratanov won gold in the men's 400 metres, setting a new Bulgarian indoor record of 47.79 in the final to defeat West Germany's defending champion Hermann Köhler. Bratanov set his personal best in the 400 m hurdles, 49.77, in Fürth on 13 June 1976; he was the first Bulgarian to break 50 seconds. He made his Olympic debut in Montreal later that summer, running 51.84 in the heats and 50.11 in the semi-finals; he qualified for the Olympic final, in which he placed sixth in 50.03.

In total, Bratanov was a seven-time Bulgarian champion; five times outdoors in the 400 m hurdles (1972, 1973, 1974, 1978 and 1979) and twice indoors over 400 m (1974 and 1975). At the 1978 European Championships in Prague Bratanov was eliminated in the semi-finals, but at the 1980 Summer Olympics in Moscow he again qualified for the Olympic final; he was the only athlete to make the 400 m hurdles final in both Montreal and Moscow. He suffered a cramp in the Moscow final and placed a clear last in 56.35.

Coaching career

Bratanov retired as an athlete in 1983, but remained active in track and field as a coach. Initially, he coached in Bulgaria, moving to Qatar in 1992; his Qatari pupils included Asian champions Samuel Francis and Femi Ogunode. , Bratanov is coaching in Bahrain; he coached Bahrain's team for the 2014 World Junior Championships in Eugene, Oregon, but was unable to attend personally after being denied a visa.

References

1952 births
Living people
Sportspeople from Sliven
Bulgarian male hurdlers
Bulgarian male sprinters
Bulgarian athletics coaches
Olympic athletes of Bulgaria
Athletes (track and field) at the 1976 Summer Olympics
Athletes (track and field) at the 1980 Summer Olympics
Bulgarian expatriates in Qatar